Gingidiobora is a genus of moths in the family Geometridae described by Robin C. Craw in 1987. This genus is endemic to New Zealand.

Species

References

Geometridae
Endemic fauna of New Zealand
Taxa named by Robin Craw
Endemic moths of New Zealand